Thomas Cook House may refer to:

Thomas Cook House (Somerville, Massachusetts), listed on the National Register of Historic Places (NRHP)
Thomas Cook House (Milwaukee, Wisconsin), NRHP-listed

See also
Cook House (disambiguation)